Castelcucco is a comune (municipality) in the Province of Treviso in the Italian region Veneto, located about  northwest of Venice and about  northwest of Treviso.

Castelcucco borders the following municipalities: Asolo, Cavaso del Tomba, Monfumo, Paderno del Grappa, Possagno.

Demographic evolution

Twin towns
Castelcucco is twinned with:

  Rohr in Niederbayern, Germany, since 2004

Other information 
The territorial district has undergone the following changes: in 1928 the municipality is suppressed and its territories aggregated to the municipality of Asolo; in 1946 the municipality was reconstituted (Census 1936: pop. res. 1581).

References

Cities and towns in Veneto